The river Jalón is located in the northeast of Spain, and is one of the principal tributaries of the Ebro.

The course of the river forms the main communication route between the Castilian Plateau and the Ebro.  Until the late twentieth century, roads and railways between Madrid and Zaragoza followed this path.

Geography

The Jalón rises in one of the springs at the foot of the Sierra Ministra, a hill in Esteras de Medinaceli, Medinaceli (Soria), and then runs  through Arcos de Jalón, to Monreal de Ariza, province of Zaragoza, Aragón.

The tributary river Nágima joins at Monreal de Ariza and the Henar at Cetina before the river enters a limestone gorge at Alhama de Aragón.  The Jalón then meanders through the Paleozoic zones of the Cordillera Ibérica near Bubierca, being joined by the Piedra and the Manubles at Ateca. At Calatayud, the river expands into a broad valley and is joined by the Jiloca, Perejiles and Ribota. The next section meanders through the Sierra de Algairén and the Sierra de la Virgen.

Once out of the mountains the river enters the Ebro valley and is joined by the rivers Aranda, Grío and Alpartir before joining the Ebro at Torres de Berrellén, a suburb of the city of Zaragoza.

Ecology
Much of the course of the Jalón has been declared a Special Zone for Bird Protection. Birdlife includes falcons, eagles, and vultures. Other species include owls, wrens, and herons.  Poplar, willow and ash. Carp, trout and eels were economically important in the past and are returning as pollution is being combated.  The Plan Hidrológico del río Jalón, a river management plan, was adopted by the Spanish Ministry of the Environment and the governments of Aragon, Castile and León and Castile-La Mancha in 2007.

Etymology 
According to E. Bascuas, "Jalón" is a form belonging to the old European hydronymy, and derived from the Indoeuropean  root *sal- 'flowing water, stream'.

See also 
 List of rivers of Spain

References

External links
Confederación Hidrográfica del Ebro (Spanish) - Data and documentation on rivers of the Ebro Basin

Rivers of Spain
Province of Zaragoza
Province of Soria
Ebro basin
Sistema Ibérico
Rivers of Aragon